David Knowles (born September 5, 1952) served in the California legislature representing the 7th District from December 3, 1990 - November 30, 1992 and the 4th district from December 7, 1992 – November 30, 1996.

Knowles also served as a Chief Executive for the California Earthquake Authority from January 4, 1999 - January 16, 2002.

References

1952 births
Living people
Republican Party members of the California State Assembly